Dragomir Krančević (Serbian Cyrillic: Драгомир Кранчевић, ; 4 October 1847 – 19 May 1929) was a Serbian violinist in Austria-Hungary.

Biography
Born in Pančevo, Banat Military Frontier, Austrian Empire, Krančević was the son of a wealthy and respected merchant's family from Pančevo. He attended the primary school and the gymnasium of his native place. The little boy received his first violin lessons during the school education. Karl Heisler, his private violin instructor of Danube Swabian origin, recommended further promotion of his musical talent in Vienna. At the age of ten years, Krančević arrived in the capital city of the Austrian Empire and continued his education. In 1859, he completed the entrance examination at the Viennese Conservatory of the Gesellschaft der Musikfreunde. Joseph Hellmesberger Sr. immediately recognized his extraordinary talent and accepted him as a student. In 1861, Krančević gave his first public performance in Pančevo, a charity concert for the benefit of the city hospital. In March 1862, he made his Viennese debut at the ballroom of the old Musikverein's building, a charity concert in favor of the Serbian Orthodox Church.

The young violinist became a recognized virtuoso and he performed brilliantly in concert tours, which led him to Linz, Bad Ischl, Salzburg, Prague, Leipzig, Bratislava, Belgrade, Novi Sad and many other cities. A highlight during his concert tour of 1872 was a multi-day celebration with Davorin Jenko, the First Belgrade Singing Society and other artists in honor of the beginning of Milan IV Obrenovic's reign. He was enthusiastically acclaimed by the audience after his performances at the Serbian National Theater during two summer evenings. Since 1873, he was a member of the orchestra of Budapest's Royal Hungarian National Theater and in 1888, he was appointed first concertmaster of the Royal Hungarian Opera Orchestra during the tenure of Gustav Mahler. Krančević finished his career in 1901, retired into private life and went back to Vienna. There he lived very withdrawn from the society and the artist no longer appeared publicly. In 1922, he sold his Stradivari violin to Jan Kubelík for twenty-five thousand Czech crowns because of his personal life situation during the Austrian economic crisis.

Krančević died in Vienna, aged 81.

The archive of the Institute of Musicology of the Serbian Academy of Sciences and Arts preserves some personal materials of Krančević's legacy including some postcards and letters to the violinist, written by Johannes Brahms and a few other artists of that time.

His nephew Petar Krančević (1869-1919) was a composer and choirmaster of the Serbian Singing Society of Sremska Mitrovica.

References

1847 births
1929 deaths
People from Pančevo
Austro-Hungarian Serbs
Serbian classical violinists
Austrian classical violinists